Heinrich von Ahaus (in Dutch Hendrik van Ahuis) (1371–1439) was the founder of the Brethren of the Common Life in Germany.

Biography
He was born in 1371, the natural son of Ludolf, Lord of the principality of Ahaus, and Hadwigis of Schöppingen. About 1396 he joined the Brethren of the Common Life at Deventer, where personal intercourse with the companions of the founder, especially Florentius Radewyns, thoroughly acquainted him with the spirit and methods of the congregation, then in its first fervour. It is probable that during the plague of 1398 he left Deventer for Amersfort (another Dutch city) with Florentius, on whose death he returned to his native Münster to establish a community there.
 
In any case the records at Münster point to 1400 as the date of foundation. The benefactions of his family enabled Heinrich to provide generously for the new community, and in 1429 to establish it on his family estate of Springbrunnen (Ad fontem salientem), where he and his companions, besides continuing their missionary work in the diocese, applied themselves to the copying of manuscripts. Heinrich also founded houses of the congregation at Cologne (1416), Wesel (1435) and Osnabrück, and the communities of sisters at Borken, Coesfeld, Lippstadt, Wesel and Bodeken, labouring all the while in the face of continuous opposition from both priests and laymen.
 
He accompanied Johann Vos van Heusden, rector of Windesheim, to the Council of Constance (1414–18), to refute the charges lodged against the Brethren by the Dominican Mathüus Grabow, and of which they were triumphantly cleared. In 1428 he inaugurated the union of the Münster and Cologne houses, which was sanctioned by papal decree, a few months after his death, and joined in 1441 by the house at Wesel. He died at Münster in 1439.
 
Heinrich's influence was incalculable, in connection with the training and reform of the clergy, the cause of education, the spread of religious literature and the advancement of the spiritual life among the masses of the German people.

Sources

1371 births
1439 deaths
Dutch Christian religious leaders